Ted Vince is a former Canadian wheelchair athlete. Vince won the 1988 London Marathon men's wheelchair race, narrowly defeating Mike Bishop and defending champion Chris Hallam to set a new course record of 2:01:37. He competed in the 1984 and 1988 Summer Paralympics, winning two bronze medals the latter year in the 400 metres and the marathon.

References

External links
 

Year of birth missing (living people)
Living people
Canadian male wheelchair racers
Paralympic wheelchair racers
Paralympic track and field athletes of Canada
Paralympic bronze medalists for Canada
Paralympic medalists in athletics (track and field)
Athletes (track and field) at the 1984 Summer Paralympics
Athletes (track and field) at the 1988 Summer Paralympics
Medalists at the 1988 Summer Paralympics